was a village located in Asakura District, Fukuoka Prefecture, Japan.

As of 2003, the village had an estimated population of 1,663 and a density of 73.71 persons per km². The total area was 22.56 km².

On March 28, 2005, Hōshuyama, along with the village of Koishiwara (also from Asakura District), was merged to create the village of Tōhō.

External links
 Tōhō official website  

Dissolved municipalities of Fukuoka Prefecture
Populated places disestablished in 2005
2005 disestablishments in Japan